Giustino Durano (5 May 1923 – 18 February 2002) was an Italian actor best known for his work as Eliseo Orefice in the 1997 film Life Is Beautiful. For his role, he was nominated in part for a Screen Actors Guild Award for Outstanding Performance by a Cast.

Life Is Beautiful
The movie is centered on his nephew Guido and his son Giosuè. In the movie, he is the head waiter of a hotel dining room. As racial turmoil begins erupting in Italy against Jews, the waiter, his nephew and the nephew's son are taken to a concentration camp. While at the camp, he was separated from his nephew and later killed in a gas chamber along with several other elderly people.

Death
Durano died in 2002 after a long battle with cancer.

Partial filmography

 Red and Black (1955)
 Lucky to Be a Woman (1956) - Federico Frotta
 Lo svitato (1956)
 Tipi da spiaggia (1959) - Nick Balmora
 Queen of the Pirates (1960) - Battista, the Count's Manservant
 Accroche-toi, y'a du vent! (1961) - Un malvivente
 Cronache del '22 (1961)
 Rage of the Buccaneers (1961) - Juan
 Freddy and the Millionaire (1961) - Polizist
 The Golden Arrow (1962) - Absent-Minded genie
 Imperial Venus (1962) - Bousque
 Tutto è musica (1963) - Kurt
 Follie d'estate (1963) - Pianista
 Vino, whisky e acqua salata (1963)
 Male Companion (1964) - Le boulanger / A Baker (uncredited)
 Me, Me, Me... and the Others (1966) - Policeman
 After the Fox (1966) - Critic
 The Bobo (1967) - Druggist (uncredited)
 Come rubare un quintale di diamanti in Russia (1967) - Roland
 Bang Bang Kid (1967) - Hotchkiss
 Le lys de mer (1969)
 The Balloon Vendor (1974) - Receptionist
 Salvo D'Acquisto (1974) - Riccardo
 Life Is Beautiful (1997)  - Zio
 Fate un bel sorriso (2000) - Antonio
 Amici ahrarara (2001) - Zio Giannangelo
 Andata e ritorno (2003) - Sig. Sorelli (final film role)

References

1923 births
2002 deaths
Italian male film actors
Nastro d'Argento winners
20th-century Italian male actors
Deaths from cancer in Emilia-Romagna